In firearms, the chamber is the cavity at the back end of a breechloader's barrel or cylinder, where the cartridge is inserted before being fired.  The rear opening of the chamber is the breech, and is sealed by the breechblock or the bolt.

Function 
Pistols, rifles, and shotguns generally have a single chamber integral to their barrels, but revolvers have multiple chambers in their cylinder, and no chamber in their barrel. Thus, pistols, rifles, and shotguns can usually still be fired with the magazine removed as long as a cartridge is inserted into the chamber, while a revolver cannot be fired at all with its cylinder swung out or broken open.

The act of chambering a cartridge means the insertion of a round into the chamber, either manually or through the action of the weapon, e.g., pump-action, lever-action, bolt action, or autoloading operation generally in anticipation of firing the weapon, without need to "load" the weapon upon decision to use it (reducing the number of actions needed to discharge).

In firearms design or modification, "chambering" is fitting a weapon's chamber for a particular caliber or round, so a Colt Model 1911 is chambered for .45 ACP or .38 Super, or re-chambered for .38/.45 Clerke. While the majority of firearms are chambered for one caliber, some are chambered for multiple calibers; however firing an oversized or undersized cartridge can be hazardous.

Forensics 
The chamber is a key component to the practice of Forensic firearm examination. The chamber is known to imprint its surface striations irregularities on the cartridge case, in what are called chamber marks, due to the pressure produced when shooting. Such imperfections in chamber may be produced in the manufacturing process or through extensive use. Such chamber marks are even more pronounced on substandard firearms or when firing from an undersized chamber. 

In recent years there has been a push to automate this process via the use of automated firearms databases. Ballistics  identification has also seen the development of microstamping technology which purposefully creates chamber marks through engravings on the firing pin and breech face.

Sources

See also
Glossary of firearms terms

External links 
 Chamber

Firearm components